Chuck Fischer is an American muralist, designer, and author of pop-up books. He was featured in an exhibit in the National Museum of American History entitled Paper Engineering: Fold, Pull, Pop & Turn along with paper engineer Bruce Foster. His fabric and wallpaper designs are part of the permanent collection at the Cooper–Hewitt, National Design Museum.

Bibliography
 A Christmas Carol: A Pop-Up Book (Little, Brown, 2010)
 Angels: A Pop-Up Book (Little, Brown, 2009)
 In the Beginning: A Pop-Up Book (Little, Brown, 2008)
 Christmas Around the World: A Pop-Up Book (Little, Brown, 2007)
 Christmas in New York: A Pop-Up Book (Little, Brown, 2005)
 The White House: A Pop-Up Book (Rizzoli, 2004)
 Wallcoverings: Applying the Language of Color and Pattern (Rizzoli, 2003)
 Great American Houses and Gardens (Rizzoli, 2002)

References

External links 
 
 Fischer discusses the creation of his book Angels: A Pop-Up Book
 Chuck Fischer Papers housed at the Kenneth Spencer Research Library, University of Kansas

American muralists
Living people
Pop-up book artists
Year of birth missing (living people)